John Grattan O'Connell (October 27, 1902 – March 14, 1942) was an American professional football player who played two seasons in the National Football League (NFL) from 1926 to 1927. He played for the Hartford Blues during the 1926 season and the Providence Steam Roller during the 1927 season.

Prior to his professional career, he played at the football at the college level, while attending Boston College. While in college, he started every game of his four-year football career with the Eagles. He once blocked six kicks in a game, while at BC and earned All-American honors during his junior year. Outside of football, he played for the school's basketball team.

O'Connell was a cartoonist and contributed to The Heights while at Boston College. At the time of his death, O'Connell was working as a sportswriter for the Hartford Courant.

In 1971, he was inducted into the Boston College Varsity Club Athletic Hall of Fame.

References

Boston College Player Bio

1902 births
1942 deaths
Players of American football from Connecticut
Boston College Eagles football players
Boston College Eagles men's basketball players
Hartford Blues players
Providence Steam Roller players
American men's basketball players
American cartoonists